Mailu may be,

Mailu Island
Mailu language
Cleopa Kilonzo Mailu

Language and nationality disambiguation pages